Nightwork: A History of Hacks and Pranks at MIT (first edition, 2003); (revised edition, 2011) is a book which presents a historical catalog of some of the best-known MIT hacks (technically sophisticated practical jokes) as well as a series of essays reflecting on the cultural significance of hacks. MIT is one of the most selective university in the United States, with a long-standing hacker tradition.

Nightwork combines The Journal of the Institute for Hacks, TomFoolery, and Pranks at MIT (J. IHTFP) with Is This The Way To Baker House? and new elements. The "author" of Nightwork is listed as "Institute Historian T. F. Peterson", which is a reference to the MIT cultural acronym IHTFP.

See also

 Campus of the Massachusetts Institute of Technology
 Hacker (term)
 Hacks at the Massachusetts Institute of Technology
 Roof and tunnel hacking

References

External links 
 Book overview at MIT Press
 The Best of the IHTFP Hack Gallery

2011 non-fiction books
Popular culture books
Student culture in the United States
Massachusetts Institute of Technology student life
University folklore
MIT Press books